Lauren Necochea is an American politician serving as a member of the Idaho House of Representatives from the 19th district, which includes a portion of Boise, Idaho.

Early life and education 
Necochea was born and raised in Boise, Idaho. She earned a Bachelor of Arts degree in economics from Pomona College and a Master of Arts in public affairs from Princeton University. Necochea was the recipient of a Fulbright Scholarship.

Career 
After earning her master's degree, Necochea worked as a program evaluator for the Baltimore City Health Department. She later returned to Boise. She worked as the director of the Idaho Center for Fiscal Policy and Idaho Voices for Children. In December 2019, Necochea was appointed to the Idaho House of Representatives by Governor Brad Little, succeeding Mat Erpelding, who resigned from the House to take a lobbying position.

Personal life 
Necochea lives in Boise, Idaho with her husband and two daughters.

References

External links

21st-century American politicians
21st-century American women politicians
Living people
Democratic Party members of the Idaho House of Representatives
People from Boise, Idaho
Pomona College alumni
Princeton University alumni
Women state legislators in Idaho
Year of birth missing (living people)
American people of Basque descent